Dom Peter III (5 July 1717 – 25 May 1786), nicknamed the Builder, was King of Portugal from 24 February 1777 to his death in 1786 as the co-ruler of his wife and niece, Queen Dona Maria I.

Early life 

Peter was born at 12:00 noon on 5 July 1717 in the Ribeira Palace in Lisbon, Portugal. He was baptized on 29 August and was given the name Peter Clemente Francisco José António. His parents were King John V of Portugal and his wife Maria Ana of Austria. Peter was a younger brother of Joseph I of Portugal. Their maternal grandparents were Leopold I, Holy Roman Emperor, and Eleonor Magdalene of Neuburg, sister of Queen Maria Sofia of Portugal.

Reign 
Peter married his niece Maria, Princess of Brazil, in 1760, at which time she was the heiress presumptive to the throne then held by his brother Joseph I. According to custom, Peter thus became king of Portugal in right of his wife, after the delivery of his first born child. They had six children, of whom the eldest surviving son succeeded Maria as John VI of Portugal on her death in 1816.

Peter made no attempt to participate in government affairs, spending his time hunting or in religious exercises.

He also defended the high nobility of Portugal, and sponsored the petitions of those accused in Távora affair, whose rehabilitation was subject of new lawsuits, in which the heirs demanded the restitution of their confiscated properties.

Peter III was moderately friendly toward the Jesuits, who had been banished from Portugal and its overseas empire in 1759, largely at the behest of the Marquis of Pombal.  Peter III had taken some of his early education from the Jesuits, explaining this.  His affection had little effect; Pope Clement XIV ordered the Jesuits suppressed across Europe in 1773.

Marriage and issue 
The couple married on 6 June 1760. At the time of their marriage, Maria was 25 and Peter was 42. Despite the age gap, the couple had a happy marriage. Peter automatically became co-monarch (as Peter III of Portugal) when Maria ascended the throne, as a child had already been born from their marriage. The couple had six children and a stillborn baby.

Ancestors

Notes

References 
 

Kings consort
Jure uxoris kings
18th-century Portuguese monarchs
Burials at the Monastery of São Vicente de Fora
House of Braganza
Portuguese infantes
People from Lisbon
Portuguese royal consorts
1717 births
1786 deaths